Shahr-e Zur (also Romanized as Shahr-e Zūr) is a village in Kani Bazar Rural District, Khalifan District, Mahabad County, West Azerbaijan Province, Iran. At the 2006 census, its population was 279, in 47 families.

References 

Populated places in Mahabad County